Christopher Robert Thyer (born December 5, 1969) is an American lawyer and politician from Arkansas. He is a former United States Attorney for the Eastern District of Arkansas and a former member of the Arkansas House of Representatives. He is a member of the Democratic Party.

Education
Thyer graduated from Arkansas State University in 1991 with a bachelor's degree in Accounting. Thyer earned his J.D. degree from the University of Arkansas in 1995.

Career
From 1995 to 1997 he was a solo practitioner for the Moody Law Firm in Jonesboro, Arkansas and was later a partner with the firm from 1997 to 2005. From 2005 to 2007 he was a partner with Halsey & Thyer, PLC.

Thyer served in the Arkansas House of Representatives from 2003 to 2009. From 2007 to 2010 he was a partner with the law firm Stanley & Thyer, P.A.

Thyer was nominated by President Obama to serve as the United States Attorney for the Eastern District of Arkansas in 2010. He was later confirmed by the Senate and served until his resignation on March 10, 2017.

Personal life
Thyer is married to Cindy Thyer, a judge on the Arkansas Court of Appeals and a former Greene County Circuit Court Judge.

See also
 2017 dismissal of U.S. attorneys

References

1969 births
Living people
Politicians from Kansas City, Missouri
Arkansas State University alumni
University of Arkansas School of Law alumni
Arkansas lawyers
Democratic Party members of the Arkansas House of Representatives
United States Attorneys for the Eastern District of Arkansas
Lawyers from Kansas City, Missouri